Dorian Lance James (born 19 June 1981) is a male badminton player from South Africa.

James competed in badminton at the 2004 Summer Olympics in men's doubles with partner Stewart Carson.  They were defeated in the round of 32 by Howard Bach and Kevin Han of the United States.

At the 2012 Summer Olympics, he competed with Willem Viljoen in the men's doubles event.  They did not progress beyond the group stages.

Achievements

All African  Games 
Men's doubles

African  Championships 
Men's doubles

Mixed doubles

BWF International Challenge/Series
Men's doubles

Mixed doubles

 BWF International Challenge tournament
 BWF International Series tournament
 BWF Future Series tournament

References

tournamentsoftware.com

External links 
 
 
 
 
 

1981 births
Living people
Sportspeople from Cape Town
South African male badminton players
South African people of British descent
Badminton players at the 2004 Summer Olympics
Badminton players at the 2012 Summer Olympics
Olympic badminton players of South Africa
Badminton players at the 2006 Commonwealth Games
Commonwealth Games competitors for South Africa
Competitors at the 2007 All-Africa Games
Competitors at the 2011 All-Africa Games
African Games silver medalists for South Africa
African Games medalists in badminton